The siege of Cassel took place between October and November 1762, when an allied force of Hanoverian, Hessian  and British troops under the command of the Duke of Brunswick besieged and captured the French-held town of Cassel. It was the final engagement of the Seven Years' War in Western Europe, as the conflict was brought to an end by the Peace of Paris the following year.

News of the town's capture arrived after the preliminaries of the peace treaty had been signed in Paris, so it did not have the dramatic impact that Brunswick had hoped for. It was acknowledged that the garrison's unexpectedly long resistance had allowed the French to negotiate from a much stronger position.

See also
 Great Britain in the Seven Years War

References

Bibliography
 Dull, Jonathan R. The French Navy and the Seven Years' War. University of Nebraska, 2005.

Cassel (1762)
Cassel (1762)
Cassel
Cassel
Cassel
History of Kassel
1762 in the Holy Roman Empire
Cassel